The women's heptathlon event at the 2011 Asian Athletics Championships took place on July 8–9, 2011 at the Kobe Universiade Memorial Stadium.

Medalists

Results

100 metres hurdles
Wind:Heat 1: –1.8 m/s, Heat 2: –0.4 m/s

High jump

Shot put

200 metres
Wind:Heat 1: +1.1 m/s, Heat 2: –0.7 m/s

Long jump

Javelin throw

800 metres

Final standings

References
Results

2011 Asian Athletics Championships
Combined events at the Asian Athletics Championships
2011 in women's athletics